Kozokhta is a rural locality (a selo) in Yugskoye Rural Settlement, Cherepovetsky District, Vologda Oblast, Russia. The population was 5 as of 2002. There are 2 streets.

Geography 
Zhary is the nearest rural locality.

References 

Rural localities in Cherepovetsky District